

338001–338100 

|-bgcolor=#f2f2f2
| colspan=4 align=center | 
|}

338101–338200 

|-bgcolor=#f2f2f2
| colspan=4 align=center | 
|}

338201–338300 

|-id=274
| 338274 Valancius ||  || Motiejus Kazimieras Valancius (1801–1875) was a Roman Catholic bishop of Samogitia, historian and one of the best known Lithuanian writers of the 19th century. He also was the inaugurator of the temperance movement in Lithuania. || 
|-id=284
| 338284 Hodál ||  || Gabriel Hodál (born 1963), a Slovak amateur astronomer and astronomy popularizer of the astronomy club in Nové Zámky. || 
|}

338301–338400 

|-id=373
| 338373 Fonóalbert ||  || Albert Fonó (1881–1972), a Hungarian mechanical engineer || 
|}

338401–338500 

|-bgcolor=#f2f2f2
| colspan=4 align=center | 
|}

338501–338600 

|-bgcolor=#f2f2f2
| colspan=4 align=center | 
|}

338601–338700 

|-bgcolor=#f2f2f2
| colspan=4 align=center | 
|}

338701–338800 

|-bgcolor=#f2f2f2
| colspan=4 align=center | 
|}

338801–338900 

|-bgcolor=#f2f2f2
| colspan=4 align=center | 
|}

338901–339000 

|-bgcolor=#f2f2f2
| colspan=4 align=center | 
|}

References 

338001-339000